The 5th Guard Grenadiers (German: Garde-Grenadier-Regiment Nr. 5) was a regiment of the Prussian Army prior to and during the First World War. Established in 1897, it was part of the 5th Guard Infantry Brigade.  The regiment was disbanded following the war and perpetuated by 5th and 6th Company, 4th Infantry Regiment of the Reichswehr.

See also
List of Imperial German infantry regiments

Military units and formations established in 1897
Guards regiments of the Prussian Army
Grenadier regiments
Military units and formations disestablished in 1919